Leopold Bauer (1 September 1872 – 7 October 1938) was an Austrian architect. His work was part of the architecture event in the art competition at the 1936 Summer Olympics.

References

1872 births
1938 deaths
20th-century Austrian architects
Olympic competitors in art competitions
People from Krnov
People from Austrian Silesia
Silesian-German people